"Gone!" is a song by English rock band The Cure, released as the fourth and final single from their tenth studio album Wild Mood Swings in December 1996. The single contained numerous remixes as B-sides.

Music video 

A video was recorded for the song at a live concert in Los Angeles in August 1996.

Release 

Released on December 2, 1996, the song did not achieve commercial success, reaching number 60 on the UK Singles Chart, and was played infrequently at concerts, despite the band having performed it on Later with Jools Holland.

In an overview of the band's career, Clash magazine said that, alongside "The 13th", "Gone!" has become known for dividing fans, describing them as "love/hate affairs", but noted they "still [show] a band happy to experiment and play with conventions." Peter Parrish of Stylus Magazine described "Gone!" as containing an "um-pa-pa horn action and rinky-dink keyboards."

Track listing

CD 1
"Gone! (Radio Mix)"
"The 13th (Feels Good Mix)"
"This Is a Lie (Ambient Mix)"
"Strange Attraction (Strange Mix)"

CD 2
"Gone! (Radio Mix)"
"Gone! (Critter Mix)"
"Gone! (Ultra Living Mix)" 
"Gone! (Spacer Mix)"

Personnel

Robert Smith – vocals, guitar
Simon Gallup – bass
Perry Bamonte – keyboards
Roger O'Donnell – keyboards
Jason Cooper – drums

References

External links
 

The Cure songs
Songs written by Robert Smith (musician)
1996 singles
Songs written by Perry Bamonte
Songs written by Jason Cooper
Songs written by Roger O'Donnell
Songs written by Simon Gallup
1996 songs
Fiction Records singles